Northrup Head is an ice-covered headland on the north side of Suvorov Glacier. The headland, a coastal extension of the Wilson Hills, stands 3.5 nautical miles (6 km) west-southwest of Belousov Point. Mapped by United States Geological Survey (USGS) from surveys and U.S. Navy air photos, 1960–63. Named by Advisory Committee on Antarctic Names (US-ACAN) for David A. Northrup, ATN2, U.S. Navy, Aviation Electronics Technician with Squadron VX-6 at McMurdo Station, 1967.

Headlands of Victoria Land
Pennell Coast